Events from the year 1657 in Ireland.

Incumbent
Lord Protector: Oliver Cromwell

Events
 8 June – the Parliament of England passes the Act of Settlement for the Assuring, Confirming and Settling of lands and estates in Ireland, confirming legal arrangements made under the Act for the Settlement of Ireland 1652.
 17 November – Henry Cromwell, son of Oliver Cromwell, appointed Lord Lieutenant of Ireland.
 Town of Skibbereen chartered.

Births

Deaths
 July – Ulick Burke, 1st Marquess of Clanricarde, nobleman and figure in English Civil War (b. 1604)
 Luke Wadding, Franciscan friar and historian (b. 1588)

References

 
1650s in Ireland
Ireland
Years of the 17th century in Ireland